Østerdal Billag is a Norwegian bus operator operating in Østerdalen in Innlandet. The company also operates in cooperates with Gauldal Billag on a NOR-WAY express bus between Trondheim and Oslo. The company has its headquarters in Tynset. The company was founded in 1973 as a merger between 23 local bus companies and is owned by Gauldal Billag.

References

Bus companies of Innlandet
Companies based in Innlandet
Transport companies established in 1973
1973 establishments in Norway
Fosen Trafikklag